The Empire of Japan occupied the Dutch East Indies (now Indonesia) during World War II from March 1942 until after the end of the war in September 1945. It was one of the most crucial and important periods in modern Indonesian history.

In May 1940, Germany occupied the Netherlands, and martial law was declared in the Dutch East Indies. Following the failure of negotiations between the Dutch authorities and the Japanese, Japanese assets in the archipelago were frozen. The Dutch declared war on Japan following the 7 December 1941 Attack on Pearl Harbor. The Japanese invasion of the Dutch East Indies began on 10 January 1942, and the Imperial Japanese Army overran the entire colony in less than three months. The Dutch surrendered on 8 March.  Initially, most Indonesians welcomed the Japanese as liberators from their Dutch colonial masters. The sentiment changed, however, as between 4 and 10 million Indonesians were recruited as forced labourers (romusha) on economic development and defense projects in Java. Between 200,000 and half a million were sent away from Java to the outer islands, and as far as Burma and Siam. Of those taken off Java, not more than 70,000 survived the war. Four million people died in the Dutch East Indies as a result of famine and forced labour during the Japanese occupation, including 30,000 European civilian internee deaths.

In 1944–1945, Allied troops largely bypassed the Dutch East Indies and did not fight their way into the most populous parts such as Java and Sumatra. As such, most of the Dutch East Indies was still under occupation at the time of Japan's surrender in August 1945.

The occupation was the first serious challenge to the Dutch in their colony and ended the Dutch colonial rule. By its end, changes were so numerous and extraordinary that the subsequent Indonesian National Revolution became possible. Unlike the Dutch, the Japanese facilitated the politicisation of Indonesians down to the village level. The Japanese educated, trained and armed many young Indonesians and gave their nationalist leaders a political voice. Thus, through both the destruction of the Dutch colonial regime and the facilitation of Indonesian nationalism, the Japanese occupation created the conditions for the proclamation of Indonesian independence within days of the Japanese surrender in the Pacific. However, the Netherlands sought to reclaim the Indies, and a bitter five-year diplomatic, military and social struggle ensued, resulting in the Netherlands recognising Indonesian sovereignty in December 1949.

Background 
Until 1942, what is now Indonesia was a colony of the Netherlands and was known as the Dutch East Indies. In 1929, during the Indonesian National Awakening, Indonesian nationalist leaders Sukarno and Mohammad Hatta (later founding President and Vice-president), foresaw a Pacific War and that a Japanese advance on the Dutch East Indies might be advantageous for the independence cause.

The Japanese spread the word that they were the 'Light of Asia'. Japan was the only Asian nation that had successfully transformed itself into a modern technological society at the end of the 19th century and it remained independent when most Asian countries had been under European or American power, and had beaten a European power, Russia, in war. Following its military campaign in China, Japan turned its attention to Southeast Asia, advocating to other Asians a 'Greater East Asian Co-Prosperity Sphere', which they described as a type of trade zone under Japanese leadership. The Japanese had gradually spread their influence through Asia in the first half of the 20th century and during the 1920s and 1930s had established business links in the Indies. These ranged from small town barbers, photographic studios and salesmen, to large department stores and firms such as Suzuki and Mitsubishi becoming involved in the sugar trade.

The Japanese population peaked in 1931 with 6,949 residents before starting a gradual decrease, largely due to economic tensions between Japan and the Netherlands Indies government. A number of Japanese had been sent by their government to establish links with Indonesian nationalists, particularly with Muslim parties, while Indonesian nationalists were sponsored to visit Japan. Such encouragement of Indonesian nationalism was part of a broader Japanese plan for an 'Asia for the Asians'. While most Indonesians were hopeful for the Japanese promise of an end to the Dutch racially based system, Chinese Indonesians, who enjoyed a privileged position under Dutch rule, were less optimistic. Japanese aggression in Manchuria and China in the late 1930s caused anxiety amongst the Chinese in Indonesia who set up funds to support the anti-Japanese effort. Dutch intelligence services also monitored Japanese living in Indonesia.

In November 1941, Madjlis Rakjat Indonesia, an Indonesian organisation of religious, political and trade union groups, submitted a memorandum to the Dutch East Indies Government requesting the mobilisation of the Indonesian people in the face of the war threat. The memorandum was rejected because the Government did not consider the Madjlis Rakyat Indonesia to be representative of the people. Less than four months later, the Japanese had occupied the archipelago.

Invasion 

On 8 December 1941, the Dutch government-in-exile declared war on Japan. In January the American-British-Dutch-Australian Command (ABDACOM) was formed to co-ordinate Allied forces in South East Asia, under the command of General Archibald Wavell. In the weeks leading up to the invasion, senior Dutch government officials went into exile, taking political prisoners, family, and personal staff to Australia. Before the arrival of Japanese troops, there were conflicts between rival Indonesian groups where people were killed, vanished or went into hiding. Chinese- and Dutch-owned properties were ransacked and destroyed.

The invasion in early 1942 was swift and complete. By January 1942, parts of Sulawesi and Kalimantan were under Japanese control. By February, the Japanese had landed on Sumatra where they had encouraged the Acehnese to rebel against the Dutch. On 19 February, having already taken Ambon, the Japanese Eastern Task Force landed in Timor, dropping a special parachute unit into West Timor near Kupang, and landing in the Dili area of Portuguese Timor to drive out the Allied forces which had invaded in December. On 27 February, the Allied navy's last effort to contain Japan was swept aside by their defeat in the Battle of the Java Sea. From 28 February to 1 March 1942, Japanese troops landed on four places along the northern coast of Java almost undisturbed. The fiercest fighting had been in invasion points in Ambon, Timor, Kalimantan, and on the Java Sea. In places where there were no Dutch troops, such as Bali, there was no fighting. On 9 March, the Dutch commander surrendered along with Governor General Jonkheer A.W.L. Tjarda van Starkenborgh Stachouwer.

The Japanese occupation was initially greeted with optimistic enthusiasm by Indonesians who came to meet the Japanese army waving flags and shouting support such as "Japan is our older brother" and "banzai Dai Nippon". As the Japanese advanced, rebellious Indonesians in virtually every part of the archipelago killed groups of Europeans (particularly the Dutch) and informed the Japanese reliably on the whereabouts of larger groups. As famed Indonesian writer Pramoedya Ananta Toer noted: "With the arrival of the Japanese just about everyone was full of hope, except for those who had worked in the service of the Dutch.

Japanese administration 
Expecting that Dutch administrators would be kept by the Japanese to run the colony, most Dutch had refused to leave. Instead, they were sent to detention camps and Japanese or Indonesian replacements were installed in senior and technical positions. Japanese troops took control of government infrastructure and services such as ports and postal services. In addition to the 100,000 European (and some Chinese) civilians interned, 80,000 Dutch, British, Australian, and US Allied troops went to prisoner-of-war camps where the death rates were between 13 and 30 percent. The Indonesian ruling class (composed of local officials and politicians who had formerly worked for the Dutch colonial government) co-operated with the Japanese military authorities, who in turn helped to keep the local political elites in power and employ them to supply newly arrived Japanese industrial concerns and businesses and the armed forces (chiefly auxiliary military and police units run by the Japanese military in the Dutch East Indies). Indonesian co-operation allowed the Japanese military government to focus on securing the large archipelago's waterways and skies and using its islands as defense posts against any Allied attacks (which were assumed to most likely come from Australia).

The Japanese divided Indonesia into three separate regions; Sumatra (along with Malaya) was placed under the 25th Army, Java and Madura were under the 16th Army, while Borneo and eastern Indonesia were controlled by the 2nd South Fleet of the Imperial Japanese Navy (the IJN) based in Makassar. The 16th Army was headquartered in Jakarta and the 25th Army was based in Singapore until April 1943, when its command was narrowed to just Sumatra and the headquarters moved to Bukittinggi.

In Java, the Japanese 16th Army had planned to manage Java as a single entity. However the army had not brought enough administration experts to set up a separate body. A large number of Japanese residents in Java, who could have advised the occupiers, were taken to Australia at the outbreak of war, while a group of civilian administrators were killed in the Battle of the Java Sea. Problems were compounded by the fact that very few Indonesians spoke Japanese. It was only in August 1942 that the administration was formally separated from the army command. The military government was then headed by the 16th Army chief of staff. His deputy headed the most important section of the administration, the Department of General Affairs, which acted as a secretariat and issued policies. There were three Gunseikan for Java during the occupation:
 Imamura Hitoshi
 Harada Kumakichi
 Yamamoto Moichiro

Sumatra also had a Gunseikan. In the region controlled by the navy, the plan was to turn to area into a permanent colony administered by civilian Japanese bureaucrats, but still subordinate to the navy. Therefore, the IJN brought administrators with them. The chief civil administrator reported directly to the commander of the Southwest Area Fleet. Under the Sōkan were three regional administrative departments based in Makassar, Banjarmasin, and Ambon.

Treatment of the Indonesian population
Experience of the occupation varied considerably, depending upon where one lived and one's social position. Many who lived in areas considered important to the war effort experienced torture, sex slavery, arbitrary arrest and execution, and other war crimes. Many thousands of people were taken away from Indonesia as forced labourers (romusha) for Japanese military projects, including the Burma-Siam and Saketi-Bayah railways, and suffered or died as a result of ill-treatment and starvation. Between 200,000 and half a million romusha recruited from Java were forced to work by the Japanese military.

Tens of thousands of Indonesians were to starve, work as slave labourers, or be forced from their homes. In the National Revolution that followed, tens, even hundreds, of thousands, would die in fighting against the Japanese, Allied forces, and other Indonesians, before independence was achieved. A later United Nations report stated that 4,000,000 people died in Indonesia as a result of famine and forced labour during the Japanese occupation, including 30,000 European civilian internee deaths.  A Dutch government study describing how the Japanese military recruited women as prostitutes by force in Indonesia concluded that among the 200 to 300 European women working in the Japanese military brothels, "some sixty five were most certainly forced into prostitution."
Other young women (and their families), faced with various pressures in the internment camps or in wartime society, agreed to offers of work, the nature of which was frequently not explicitly stated.

Underground resistance 

Next to Sutan Sjahrir who led the student (Pemuda) underground, the only prominent opposition politician was leftist Amir Sjarifuddin who was given 25,000 guilders by the Dutch in early 1942 to organize an underground resistance through his Marxist and nationalist connections. The Japanese arrested Amir in 1943, and he only escaped execution following intervention from Sukarno, whose popularity in Indonesia and hence the importance to the war effort was recognized by the Japanese. Apart from Amir's Surabaya-based group, the active pro-Allied activities were among the Chinese, Ambonese, and Manadonese.

In September 1943 at Amuntai in South Kalimantan there was an attempt to establish an Islamic state, but this was soundly defeated. In the 1943–1944 Pontianak incidents (also known as the Mandor Affair), the Japanese orchestrated a mass arrest of Malay elites and Arabs, Chinese, Javanese, Manadonese, Dayaks, Bugis, Bataks, Minangkabau, Dutch, Indians, and Eurasians in Kalimantan, including all of the Malay Sultans, accused them of plotting to overthrow Japanese rule, and then massacred them. The Japanese falsely claimed that all of those ethnic groups and organisations such as the Islamic Pemuda Muhammadijah were involved in a plot to overthrow the Japanese and create a "People's Republic of West Borneo" (Negara Rakyat Borneo Barat). The Japanese claimed that-  "Sultans, Chinese, Indonesian government officials, Indians and Arabs, who had been antagonistic to each other, joined together to massacre Japanese.", naming the Sultan of the Pontianak Sultanate as one of the "ringleaders" in the planned rebellion. Up to 25 aristocrats, relatives of the Sultan of Pontianak, and many other prominent individuals were named as participants in the plot by the Japanese and then executed at Mandor. The Sultans of Pontianak, Sambas, Ketapang, Soekadana, Simbang, Koeboe, Ngabang, Sanggau, Sekadau, Tajan, Singtan, and Mempawa were all executed by the Japanese, respectively, their names were Sjarif Mohamed Alkadri, Mohamad Ibrahim Tsafidedin, Goesti Saoenan, Tengkoe Idris, Goesti Mesir, Sjarif Saleh, Goesti Abdoel Hamid, Ade Mohamad Arif, Goesti Mohamad Kelip, Goesti Djapar, Raden Abdul Bahri Danoe Perdana, and Mohammed Ahoufiek. They are known as the "12 Dokoh". In Java, the Japanese jailed Syarif Abdul Hamid Alqadrie, the son of Sultan Syarif Mohamad Alkadrie (Sjarif Mohamed Alkadri). Since he was in Java during the executions, the future Hamid II was the only male in his family not killed, while the Japanese beheaded all 28 other male relatives of Pontianak Sultan Mohammed Alkadri. Later in 1944, the Dayaks assassinated a Japanese man named Nakatani, who was involved in the incident and who was known for his cruelty. Sultan of Pontianak Mohamed Alkadri's fourth son, Pengeran Agoen (Pangeran Agung), and another son, Pengeran Adipati (Pangeran Adipati), were both killed by the Japanese in the incident. The Japanese had beheaded both Pangeran Adipati and Pangeran Agung, in a public execution. The Japanese extermination of the Malay elite of Pontianak paved the way for a new Dayak elite to arise in its place. According to Mary F. Somers Heidhues, during May and June 1945, some Japanese were killed in a rebellion by the Dayaks in Sanggau. According to Jamie S. Davidson, this rebellion, during which many Dayaks and Japanese were killed, occurred from April through August 1945, and was called the "Majang Desa War". The Pontianak Incidents, or Affairs, are divided into two Pontianak incidents by scholars, variously categorised according to mass killings and arrests, which occurred in several stages on different dates. The Pontianak incident negatively impacted the Chinese community in Kalimantan.

The Acehnese Ulama (Islamic clerics) fought against both the Dutch and the Japanese, revolting against the Dutch in February 1942 and against Japan in November 1942. The revolt was led by the All-Aceh Religious Scholars' Association (PUSA), and was centred around Tjot Plieng village religious school. Japanese troops armed with mortars and machine guns were attacked by sword-wielding Acehnese led by Tengku Abdul Djalil. The Japanese suffered 18 dead in the uprising while over a hundred Acehnese died, and the school and village mosque were destroyed.

Japanese effort in building a puppet state 

In the decades before the war, the Dutch had been overwhelmingly successful in suppressing the small nationalist movement in Indonesia such that the Japanese proved fundamental for coming Indonesian independence. During the occupation, the Japanese encouraged and backed Indonesian nationalistic sentiments, created new Indonesian institutions, and promoted nationalist leaders such as Sukarno. The openness now provided to Indonesian nationalism, combined with the Japanese destruction of much of the Dutch colonial state, were fundamental to the Indonesian National Revolution that followed World War Two.

As Japan's territorial expansion was halted, then reversed, Japan, the 16th Army in Java in particular, became more favorable to the idea of Indonesian involvement in the governance of Java. A Central Advisory Board was established, headed by pre-war independence figure Sukarno, with Indonesians appointed as advisors. In October 1943, the Japanese established a volunteer force to defend against a future allied invasion, the Defenders of the Homeland (PETA) Then in 1944 the Java Service Association (Jawa Hokokai) was formed to mobilise the masses for Japanese interests.

On 7 September 1944, Japanese Prime Minister Kuniaki Koiso promised independence for the 'East Indies' "in the future". The authorities in Java then allowed the flying of the Indonesian flag at Jawa Hokokai buildings. Naval liaison officer in Batavia Rear-admiral Tadashi Maeda  provided official funds for tours around the archipelago by Sukarno and fellow independence activist Hatta, officially as part of their Jawa Hokokai responsibilities. In October 1944, Maeda established a Free Indonesia Dormitory to prepare youth leaders for an independent Indonesia. With the war situation becoming increasingly dire, in March 1945 the Japanese announced the formation of an Investigating Committee for Preparatory Work for Independence (BPUPK), comprising members of the older political generation, including Sukarno and Hatta. Chaired by Rajiman Wediodiningrat, in two sessions in May and June, it decided on the basis for an independent nation and produced a draft constitution. Meanwhile, the younger activists, known as the pemuda, wanted much more overt moves towards independence than the older generation were willing to risk, resulting in a split between the generations.

On 29 April 1945, Lt. Gen. Kumakichi Harada, the commander of 16th Army in Java established the Investigating Committee for Preparatory Work for Independence (Dokuritsu Junbi Chōsakai), as the initial stage of the establishment of independence for the area under the control of the 16th Army.

End of the occupation 

General MacArthur wanted to fight his way with Allied troops to liberate Java in 1944–45 but was ordered not to by the joint chiefs and President Roosevelt. He did successfully conduct the Western New Guinea campaign in 1944 which liberated much of Dutch New Guinea. The U.S. built Naval Base Morotai, which opened in September 1944 after the Battle of Morotai, so they could use the facilities for the Philippines campaign. Some Australian bases were built during the war. The Borneo campaign between May and July 1945 was ordered by MacArthur to liberate British Borneo and Dutch Borneo. The Japanese occupation officially ended with the Japanese surrender in the Pacific and two days later Sukarno declared Indonesian Independence; Indonesian forces spent the next four years fighting the Dutch for independence. According to historian Theodore Friend, American restraint from fighting their way into Java saved Japanese, Javanese, Dutch, and American lives, but also impeded international support for Indonesian independence.

At the end of the war, there were around 300,000 Japanese civilian and military personnel in the East Indies. The Dutch East Indies, alongside French Indochina, were transferred from the American-led South West Pacific Area Command, to the UK-led South East Asia Command with effect 15 August 1945. Consequently, the UK became the lead nation in the reoccupation of the territories.  The priorities for the UK occupation was to take the surrender of, and repatriate, Japanese forces, and also the Recovery of Allied Prisoners of War and Internees (RAPWI) operation. Repatriation of Japanese prisoners of war was delayed due to their low priority for sea-borne transport in the Allied Shipping Pool. By April 1946, only 48,000 had been repatriated, however, the majority were evacuated in May and June. However, around 100,000 Japanese prisoners of war were retained for use as labour until early 1946.  It was reported that approximately 25,000 Japanese soldiers allied themselves with Indonesian nationalists and were subsequently beyond Allied control. Some eventually assimilated themselves into local communities. Many of these soldiers joined the TNI or other Indonesian military organizations, and a number of these former Japanese soldiers died during the Indonesian National Revolution, such as Abdul Rachman (Ichiki Tatsuo).

The final stages of warfare were initiated in October 1945 when, in accordance with the terms of their surrender, the Japanese tried to re-establish the authority they relinquished to Indonesians in the towns and cities. Japanese military police killed Republican pemuda in Pekalongan (Central Java) on 3 October, and Japanese troops drove Republican pemuda out of Bandung in West Java and handed the city to the British, but the fiercest fighting involving the Japanese was in Semarang. On 14 October, British forces began to occupy the city. Retreating Republican forces retaliated by killing between 130 and 300 Japanese prisoners they were holding. Five hundred Japanese and 2,000 Indonesians had been killed and the Japanese had almost captured the city six days later when British forces arrived.

From 6 March 1946 to 24 December 1949, the returning Dutch authorities held 448 war crimes trials against 1,038 suspects. 969 of those were condemned (93.4%) with 236 (24.4%) receiving a death sentence.

See also

 Bulu prison massacre
 Japanese colonial empire
 Japanese-run internment camps

Notes

References
 
 
 
 
 
 
 
 
 
 
 Dennis, Peter (1987). Troubled Days of Peace: Mountbatten and South East Asia Command, 1945-46. Manchester: Manchester University Press. .

Further reading

External links
 

 
Dutch East Indies
Indonesia in World War II
Indonesia
1940s in Indonesia
Japan–Netherlands military relations
Dutch East Indies
Invasions of the Dutch East Indies
Articles containing video clips
1940s in the Dutch East Indies
Axis powers